The University Museum at Southern Illinois University Carbondale is part of the College of Liberal Arts, and is housed in Faner Hall on the SIUC campus.  The University Museum has been a repository of artifacts since Cyrus Thomas was commissioned to begin collecting for a museum by the first board of trustees of Southern Illinois Normal University some time before 1871.  Originally housed in the building known as "Old Main", the museum first opened to the public in 1874. The museum is considered to be an "encyclopedic museum", with an inventory of 70,000 artifacts.

In 2006, the museum was the recipient of a Leadership in History Award from the American Association for State and Local History for a 2004 exhibit, Words, Wood & Wire: The History of Southern Illinois as Told Through Folk Songs and Musical Instruments.

Longtime museum director, Dona Bachman, retired in 2016, after 16 years at the university. As of March 2017, financial constraints at the university have prevented the museum from starting a search for a replacement.

The museum was accredited by the American Alliance of Museums in 1977. In February 2017, the museum lost its accreditation due to concerns about loss of staff and budget cuts. According to interim director Chris Walls, "The entire university system has failed the museum".

As a result of the state budget impasse, the University Museum was closed from May 2017 until January 2018.

References

External links 
 Youvisit.com:  Panoramic 3-D tour of the SIUC University Museum

Southern Illinois University Carbondale
University museums in Illinois
Carbondale, Illinois
Buildings and structures in Jackson County, Illinois
Tourist attractions in Jackson County, Illinois